Tonia is an Italian and Spanish feminine given name that is a diminutive form of Antonia as a feminine form of Tonino and Tonio that is used in Italy, Spain, parts of the United States, Mexico, Cuba, Dominican Republic, Guatemala, Honduras, El Salvador, Nicaragua, Costa Rica, Western Panama, Colombia, Venezuela, Peru, Ecuador, Bolivia, Chile, Paraguay, Argentina, Uruguay, and the Falkland Islands. It is also a variant of Tonja, Tonya, Tanya, Tanja, Tania. Variants of the name Tonia include LaTonia, LaTonya, and LaTanya.

Mononym
 Tonia (singer) (born 1947 as Arlette Antoine Dominicus) Belgian singer

Given name
 Tonia Buxton, Greek-Cypriot TV personality
Tonia Couch (born 1989), British diver
 Tonia Kwiatkowski (born 1971) U.S. figure skater
 Tonia Marketaki (1942-1994) Greek director
 Tonia Sotiropoulou (born 1987 as ) Greek actress
 Tonia Svaier (born 1968), Greek rower
 Tonia Tisdell (born 1992) Liberian soccer player
 Tonia Todman (born 1948) Australian TV personality
 Tonia Maria Zindel (born 1972), Swiss actress

Nickname
 Tonia Antoniazzi, nickname of Antonia Louise Antoniazzi, (born 1971) UK politician
 Tônia Carrero, nickname of Maria Antonieta Portocarrero Thedi, (born 1922) Brazilian actress

Biological name
 Teladoma tonia (T. tonia) a moth species

See also

 Latonia (disambiguation)
 Antonia (name)
Tona (name)
Tonda (name)
 Tonja (name)
 Tonya (name)
 Tanya (name)
 Tanja (name)
 Tania (name)
Tonja (name)
Tonka (name)
 Tonie (name)
Tonin (name)
 Tonio (name)
Tonita (name)
 Tonje, name
Tosia, name
Tonic Chabalala

Notes

Given names

Feminine given names
Italian feminine given names
Spanish feminine given names